The 1944–45 Montreal Canadiens season was the Canadiens' 36th season. The Canadiens placed first in the regular season, but lost to the Toronto Maple Leafs in the semi-finals.

Offseason

Regular season

Maurice Richard's 50 goals in 50 games
In 1945, Maurice Richard made NHL history by becoming the first player to score 50 goals in one season, reaching the mark on the final night of the season — 50 goals in 50 games.

Final standings

Record vs. opponents

Schedule and results

Playoffs

Player statistics

Regular season
Scoring

Goaltending

Playoffs
Scoring

Goaltending

Awards and records

Transactions

References
Canadiens on Hockey Database

Montreal Canadiens seasons
Montreal
Montreal